Defenestration is the act of throwing someone or something out of a window.

Defenestration may also refer to:

 Defenestration (band), an English heavy metal band, active from 1999 to 2004
 May the Lord Be with Us, a 2018 Czech historical television film originally titled Defenestration

See also
 Fenestration (disambiguation)